Electronic Opus is a remix album by trance DJ BT, released on October 12, 2015.

Background
On November 10, 2014, BT announced a Kickstarter project with Tommy Tallarico and TanZ Group to produce Electronic Opus, an electronic symphonic album with re-imagined, orchestral versions of BT's songs. As of December 7, 2014, the project has reached its crowd-funding goal of $250,000. A live orchestra played during Video Games Live at the Adrienne Arsht Center for the Performing Arts on March 29, 2015, while the album was released on October 12, 2015.

The album was released in Auro-3D (Audio Blu-ray) on September 30, 2016.

Track listing

References

External links
Electronic Opus official website
Electronic Opus on Facebook
Electronic Opus on Discogs
Electronic Opus on Amazon

BT (musician) compilation albums
2015 remix albums
Kickstarter-funded albums